Mark Clodfelter (born August 23, 1950) is a former member of the Michigan House of Representatives.

Early life and education
Clodfelter was born on August 23, 1950 in Flint, Michigan. In 1968, Clodfelter graduated from Flint Northwestern High School. Clodfield earned a bachelor's of arts and a master of arts degree in political science from the University of Michigan. Clodfelter earned a juris doctor degree from the University of Michigan Law School.

Career
Clodfelter was a poverty lawyer, and a member of the Michigan and Genesee County Bar Associations. He was also a member of the American Civil Liberties Union. On November 5, 1974, Clodfelter was elected to the Michigan House of Representatives, where he represented the 81st district. He was sworn in on January 8, 1975. In 1976, Clodfelter served as a delegate to the Democratic National Convention. In 1977, was an unsuccessful candidate in the Democratic primary for the Michigan Senate seat representing the 29th district. Clodfelter resigned in 1980.

Personal life
Clodfelter married in 1971.

Electoral history

References

Living people
1950 births
Michigan lawyers
Democratic Party members of the Michigan House of Representatives
Politicians from Flint, Michigan
University of Michigan Law School alumni
20th-century American lawyers
20th-century American politicians